Ahmedabad University is a private, non-profit university in Gujarat, India, set up in 2009 by the Ahmedabad Education Society. It comprises three schools and seven centres with opportunities for interdisciplinary scholarship. Ahmedabad University offers students a liberal education focused on research and interdisciplinary learning.  The University offers bachelors, masters and doctorate degree programmes in all the schools.

History 

The sponsoring body of Ahmedabad University is Ahmedabad Education Society (AES), a non-profit educational trust located in Ahmedabad. AES and its leaders have played significant roles in the founding of national institutions such as Indian Institute of Management Ahmedabad, National Institute of Design, Physical Research Laboratory, and CEPT University. The Trust is also responsible for supporting institutions such as MG College of Science, LD College of Arts, HL College of Commerce, LM College of Pharmacy, AG Teacher's College and LD Institute of Indology, amongst others. In 2009, the HL Institute of Commerce and BK Majmudar Institute of Business Administration were consolidated under Amrut Mody School of Management which is one of the Schools of Ahmedabad University.

Campus 

Ahmedabad University campus is located in Navrangpura area, which is commonly known as 'University area' of Ahmedabad city. The Ahmedabad University is a part of 250 acres owned by the Ahmedabad Education Society (AES). In Phase I of this development, about 60 acres have been earmarked for academic buildings and student amenities. The master planners for the university are HCP Design and Project Management Pvt. Ltd., Ahmedabad. The office of the Vice Chancellor is housed in building which served as the residence of VKRV Rao, a prominent Indian economist, politician and educator, and a former Principal of H L Commerce College, one of the Colleges under Ahmedabad Education Society (AES).

Schools and Centres

Ahmedabad University comprises three schools and seven centres:
 Amrut Mody School of Management
 School of Arts and Sciences
 School of Engineering and Applied Science
 Centre for Heritage Management
 VentureStudio
 Centre for Learning Futures
 Global Centre for Environment and Energy
 Centre for Inter-Asian Research
 Ahmedabad Design Lab
 International Centre for Space and Cosmology

Academics

Academic programmes 
The university provides undergraduate, postgraduate education and Doctorate degrees. The university offers the following programmes:

Undergraduate 
 Bachelor of Arts (Honours)
 Bachelor of Business Administration (Honours)
 Bachelor of Commerce (Honours)
 Bachelor of Commerce Professional (Honours)
Bachelor of Science (Honours)
 Bachelor of Technology
 Integrated Master of Business Administration
 Integrated Master of Science

Postgraduate Education 
 Master of Management Studies (Heritage Management)
 Master of Business Administration
 Global Executive Master of Business Administration (Pharmaceuticals) [12]
 Master of Technology in Computer Science and Engineering
 Master of Arts in Economics

Doctorate 
 PhD in Economics
 PhD in Environment and Sustainability
 PhD in Finance
 PhD in Heritage Management
 PhD in Human Resources
 PhD in Marketing
 PhD in Chemical Engineering
 PhD in Computer Science and Engineering
 PhD in Mechanical Engineering
 PhD in Applied Chemistry
 PhD in Applied Physics
 PhD in Humanities and Social Sciences
 PhD in Life Sciences
 PhD in Organisational Behaviour
 PhD in Chemical Engineering
 PhD in Operations Management
 PhD in Physics

Ahmedabad University also offers Independent Study Period. Independent Study Programmes (ISP) is a learning initiative, that is provided to students, not available during the regular curricular periods of the semesters. The offerings include block courses, studio inspired experiential courses, courses on perspective and skill building, innovative experiments in learning and more.

Student Amenities and Activities 

Student activities are centred in the new University Centre building.  This  building was designed by SPA Design, New Delhi and was inaugurated during the 13th Foundation Day.  The rectangular building is situated within  of the academic buildings.  It is intended to be the space that students go to whenever they have free time.  The interior staircases are patterned on the stepwell design that forms the logo of the University.

The ground floor has a cafeteria, a book store and reading/study spaces.  The first floor has indoor sports halls that can be used for conferences and other events also.  Above that is an exclusive faculty lounge and club, the student placement and career counselling.  The rooftop sports a jogging track and a futsal court.

Admissions 
The university follows a holistic review process for admissions to all its courses. For UG courses, SAT scores are considered. For Engineering, students can apply through the ACPC process of Gujarat Government or through the Joint Entrance Examination (JEE) Main Score. For joining the university through the former process, the student should be a domicile of Gujarat. Those students who are not a domicile of Gujarat can apply with their JEE scores.

The university offers a Financial aid programme through merit and need-based scholarships. The need-based scholarships provide a partial waver of tuition fees and even a complete coverage of educational

costs (including tuition and study materials, hostel and mess charges). Also, Merit Scholarships are offered in recognition of academic achievements of students.

Collaborations 
Ahmedabad University has entered into collaborations with several international research universities for academic development. These include:

Stanford University's Center for Design Research to help develop an entrepreneurial ecosystem through VentureStudio

Olin College of Engineering, USA for accelerating project-based learning specifically in the School of Engineering and Applied Science.

University of Valladolid, Spain and University of Ferrara, Italy for working with the Centre for Heritage Management in developing programmes and research activities in the area of heritage.University of Bradford to promote student and faculty exchange and joint research.

Rennes School of Business, France and Amrut Mody School of Management for students' exchange of BBA and Integrated MBA programmes.

MoU between Rady School of Management at University of California, San Diego and Amrut Mody School of Management for close cooperation.

References

External links 
 

Ahmedabad University
Educational institutions established in 2009
2009 establishments in Gujarat
Private universities in India